Lucas Ahijado Quintana (born 30 January 1995) is a Spanish footballer who plays for Real Oviedo as either a right back or a right winger.

Career
Born in Oviedo, Asturias Ahijado was a Real Oviedo youth graduate. He made his senior debut with the reserves in the 2013–14 campaign, in Tercera División championship.

Ahijado made his first team debut on 13 April 2014, coming on as a substitute for goalscorer Néstor Susaeta in a 5–1 Segunda División B home routing of Celta de Vigo B. On 15 February 2016, he renewed his contract until 2018. 

Ahijado made his professional debut on 6 September 2017, replacing Yaw Yeboah in a 0–1 home loss against CD Numancia, for the season's Copa del Rey. He helped the B-side in their promotion to Segunda División B in the following year, and was promoted to the main squad in Segunda División on 11 June 2019.

References

External links

1995 births
Living people
People from Laviana
Spanish footballers
Footballers from Asturias
Association football wingers
Segunda División B players
Tercera División players
Real Oviedo Vetusta players
Real Oviedo players